The District Councils Act, "An Act to provide for the better internal Government of that part of this Province which formerly constituted the Province of Upper Canada, by the establishment of Local or Municipal Authorities therein", was passed in August 1841 and went into effect at the start of January 1842. A separate District Councils Act was also passed in 1840 in Lower Canada by the Special Council which administered the province before the passing of the Act of Union. Previously, local government in Canada East and Canada West was based on judicial bodies appointed by the Lieutenant-Governor, the Courts of Quarter Session, which were presided over by justices of the peace. The Act, proposed by Lord Sydenham, established District Councils which consisted of a warden, clerk and treasurer, who were appointed, and district councillors, who were elected.

District councils looked after roads, bridges, schools and real estate in the district, expenses associated with the administration of justice and salaries for district and township officers. Any by-laws passed by a district council were subject to review by the governor.

The District Council Act was repealed in Canada East in 1845 and replaced by a new Municipal Act which introduced elected officials at the parish and township levels. Local government institutions in Canada West were reorganized by the Municipal Corporations Act of 1849, also known as the Baldwin Act.

References 

1841 in law
1841 in Canada
Province of Canada
1841 in British law